Andrey Alexandrovich Bryukhankov (Russian Андрей Александрович Брюханков, in ITU rankings also misspelled as Brukhankov, born 27 February 1991 in Rybinsk) is a Russian professional triathlete, bronze medalist at the Russian Elite Aquathlon Championships and bronze medalist at the Russian U23 Triathlon Championships of the year 2011, and a member of the Russian National Team. Andrey's elder brother is the Russian Triathlon Champion of the year 2011 Alexander Bryukhankov.

On 12 October 2010, he was honored with the prestigious title Master of Sports
Andrey Bryukhankov also takes part in non ITU elite competitions.
At the Volkswagen Aldiana Triathlon in Cyprus, in which most of the Russian elite triathletes took part, he placed fourth in the sprint category.

In 2010, Andrey Bryukhankov also took part in two triathlons of the prestigious French Club Championship Series Lyonnaise des Eaux and, like his elder brother Alexander Bryukhankov, he represented Mulhouse Olympique Tri.
At the Triathlon de Paris (18 July 2010), he placed 45th in the individual ranking. At the Grand Final in La Baule (Triathlon Audencia, 18 September 2010), Andrey Bryukhankov placed 40th.

ITU Competitions 
In the five years from 2006 to 2010, Andrey Bryukhankov took part in 15 ITU competitions and achieved 7 top ten positions. In 2010, for instance, he won the silver medal at the European Championships (Junior) and two medals at the Junior European Cup.
From 2009 on Andrey Bryukhankov has also taken part in Elite triathlons.

The following list is based upon the official ITU rankings and the ITU Athletes's Profile Page.
Unless indicated otherwise, the following events are triathlons (Olympic Distance) and refer to the Elite category.

External links 
 Russian Triathlon Federation in Russian

Notes 

Russian male triathletes
1991 births
Living people
People from Rybinsk
Sportspeople from Yaroslavl Oblast